Nathaniel Barratt Smithers (October 8, 1818 – January 16, 1896) was an American lawyer and politician from Dover, in Kent County, Delaware. He was a member of the Republican Party, who served as U.S. Representative from Delaware.

Early life and family
Smithers was born in Dover, Delaware, the son of the county prothonotary, Nathaniel and Susan Fisher Barratt Smithers. He was educated at Ezra Scovell's school in Dover and then at the West Nottingham Academy under Rev. James Magraw. Earning his undergraduate degree at Lafayette College in Easton, Pennsylvania in 1836, he entered the law department of Dickinson College, in Carlisle, Pennsylvania with the class of 1840. He was admitted to the Delaware Bar in 1841 and commenced its practice in Dover. His wife was his half cousin, Mary Smithers and they had four children, only one of whom survived into adulthood. She was the sister of diplomat Enoch Joyce Smithers. After Mary's death, Smithers married Mary Barratt Townsend of Frederica, Delaware.

Professional and political career
Beginning his political career as a Whig, he turned down the nomination to run for Congress in 1844 but did serve as clerk of the State Legislature in 1845 and 1847. He was a delegate to the Whig Convention in Philadelphia that nominated Millard Fillmore in 1848. But he became estranged with the mainstream of the Whigs in the state when the party rejected the gradual abolition of slavery and voted in local option concerning alcohol in 1847. He co-operated with the American Party but did not become a member.

He was a chair of the state delegation to the Republican Convention in Chicago that nominated Abraham Lincoln.  Smithers served as secretary of state for Delaware under Governor Cannon from January 20, 1863 until November 23, 1863 when he was elected to the U.S. Congress to fill a vacancy opened with the death of Democrat William Temple. While there he served on the critical Special Committee of Reconstruction and helped turn down the efforts of Arkansas and Louisiana members to be re-admitted.  He also shepherded the amendment through Congress which abolished the purchase of relief from the draft.  At the Baltimore Republican Convention in 1864, he was a member of the executive committee but did not support Andrew Johnson's nomination as vice-president.

Now classified as an Unconditional Unionist, he was defeated after that one term by John A. Nicholson, a Democrat, in 1864 and returned to private practice.  He did continue to lead the Delaware Republican delegation, in 1868 nominating Grant and in 1880 voting for Blaine. Back in Dover, he was president of the First National Bank and served on the school board.  Dickinson College awarded him the honorary doctorate in 1890.

Death and legacy
Smithers died at Dover and is buried there in the Old Methodist or Whatcoat Cemetery.

Almanac
Elections are held the first Tuesday after November 1. U.S. Representatives took office March 4 and have a two-year term.

References

External links
Biographical Directory of the United States Congress 
Delaware’s Members of Congress 

The Political Graveyard
Biography at Dickinson.edu

Places with more information
Delaware Historical Society; website; 505 North Market Street, Wilmington, Delaware 19801; (302) 655-7161
University of Delaware; Library website; 181 South College Avenue, Newark, Delaware 19717; (302) 831-2965
Newark Free Library; 750 Library Ave., Newark, Delaware; (302) 731-7550

1818 births
1896 deaths
Lafayette College alumni
People from Dover, Delaware
Secretaries of State of Delaware
Burials in Dover, Delaware
Republican Party members of the United States House of Representatives from Delaware
19th-century American politicians